Qolhak-e Sofla (also Romanized as Qolhak-e Soflá; also known as Qolhak-e Pā’īn and Kulyay) is a village in Qushkhaneh-ye Bala Rural District, Qushkhaneh District, Shirvan County, North Khorasan Province, Iran. At the 2006 census, its population was 129, in 33 families.

References 

Populated places in Shirvan County